O. orientalis  may refer to:
 Octoknema orientalis, a plant species endemic to Tanzania
 Onchidella orientalis, an air-breathing sea slug species
 Orosius orientalis, the common brown leafhopper, a leafhopper species found in Australia
 Ovis orientalis (or O. aries orientalis), the mouflon, a wild sheep species
 Oxychilus orientalis, an air-breathing land snail species found in Slovakia

See also
 Orientalis (disambiguation)